The Wedderburn, later Ogilvy-Wedderburn Baronetcy, of Balindean in the County of Perth, is a title in the Baronetage of the United Kingdom created in 1803.

Balindean
The place-name associated with the baronetcy is Balindean; the place itself is now spelled Ballindean. The estate lies near Inchture, a village between Dundee and Perth on the northern side of the Firth of Tay. In 1769 it was purchased by John Wedderburn, who had rebuilt the family fortune by slave sugar plantations in Jamaica.

In 1820 his son, the 1st baronet sold the Balindean estate to William Trotter, later Lord Provost of Edinburgh, for £67,000. The Wedderburn baronets had no further connection with Balindean, other than in the place-name associated with the title.

The  (NB spelling), the listed building visible today, is an 1832 rebuild.

Overview
The baronetcy is a revival of an earlier title held by the family, which had been forfeited in 1746 following the 1745 Rebellion.

John Wedderburn was an advocate and Clerk of Bills. On 9 August 1704 he was created a baronet, of Balindean in the County of Perth, in the Baronetage of Nova Scotia, with remainder to his heirs male whatsoever. On the death of the third Baronet in 1723 the title was inherited by Alexander Wedderburn, the nephew of the first Baronet. The fifth Baronet was a Jacobite and fought at the Battle of Culloden in 1746, where he was taken prisoner. He was executed for treason in November of the same year, with his title and estates forfeited.

However, his descendants continued to claim the title.

On 18 August 1803 David Wedderburn, "7th Baronet of Balindean" (but for the attainder), was created a baronet, of Balindean in the County of Perth, in the Baronetage of the United Kingdom, with remainder, failing heirs male of his own, to the heirs male of the fourth Baronet of the 1704 creation.  Sir David later represented Perth Burghs in the House of Commons and served as Postmaster-General for Scotland.

The third Baronet sat as Member of Parliament for Ayrshire South and Haddington Burghs while the fourth Baronet represented Banffshire in Parliament as a Liberal. On the latter's death in 1918 the title was inherited (according to the special remainder) by his kinsman John Andrew Ogilvy-Wedderburn, the fifth Baronet, who had assumed the surname of Ogilvy-Wedderburn the same year. He was a descendant of James Wedderburn-Colville, youngest son of the fifth Baronet of the 1704 creation. His grandfather Peter Wedderburn had in 1811 married Anna, daughter and heiress of James Ogilvy, and assumed the surname of Wedderburn-Ogilvy on the death of his father-in-law in 1826.

Wedderburn baronets, of Balindean (1704)

Sir John Wedderburn, 1st Baronet (1641–1706)
Sir Alexander Wedderburn, 2nd Baronet (1672–1710)
Sir John Wedderburn, 3rd Baronet (1700–1723)
Sir Alexander Wedderburn, 4th Baronet (1675–1744)
Sir John Wedderburn, 5th Baronet (1704–1746) (forfeit 1746)
"Sir John Wedderburn, 6th Baronet" (1729–1803)
"Sir David Wedderburn, 7th Baronet" (1775–1858) (created a baronet, of Balindean, in 1803)

see Wedderburn, later Ogilvy-Wedderburn Baronets of Balindean (1803 creation).

Wedderburn, later Ogilvy-Wedderburn baronets, of Balindean (1803)
Sir David Wedderburn, 1st Baronet (1775–1858)
Sir John Wedderburn, 2nd Baronet (1789–1862)
Sir David Wedderburn, 3rd Baronet (1835–1882)
Sir William Wedderburn, 4th Baronet (1838–1918)
Sir John Andrew Ogilvy-Wedderburn, 5th Baronet (1866–1956)
Sir (John) Peter Ogilvy-Wedderburn, 6th Baronet (1917–1977)
Sir Andrew John Alexander Ogilvy-Wedderburn, 7th Baronet (born 1952)

The heir apparent to the baronetcy is Peter Robert Alexander Ogilvy-Wedderburn (born 1987), eldest son of the 7th Baronet.

See also
Clan Wedderburn
Halkett baronets

Other usages of "Balindean":
Balanchine
Ballentine (disambiguation)
Ballantyne
Ballantine (surname)
Ballantine
Bellenden
Ballenden
Ballandean, Queensland

Notes

References
Kidd, Charles, Williamson, David (editors). Debrett's Peerage and Baronetage (1990 edition). New York: St Martin's Press, 1990, 

Baronetcies in the Baronetage of Nova Scotia
Baronetcies in the Baronetage of the United Kingdom
Baronetcies created with special remainders
Forfeited baronetcies
Wedderburn family